Pennapiedimonte is a comune and town in the province of Chieti, Abruzzo, central Italy.

References

Cities and towns in Abruzzo